Celestine Onyemobi Elihe Onwuliri (17 February 1952 – 3 June 2012) was a renowned university professor of Parasitology and 5th substantive Vice Chancellor of the FUTO University.
He was also the Ag. Vice Chancellor of the University of Jos and a two-time Honorable Commissioner.
After his death, an educational institution of higher learning in the US, the Graduate Theological Foundation instituted a fellowship in his honour called the Celestine O. E. Onwuliri Fellowship in Scientific Research and Human Values.

Education and personal life 
Onwuliri came from Umuokazi, Amuzi, Ahiazu Mbaise in Imo state, Nigeria. He lost both his parents at a young age; his Father, Adolpus, as a toddler and his mother, Rosanna, as a young teen. He attended St. Jude's Catholic Primary School, Amuzi and Community Secondary School, Amuzi and he graduated with a division 1 in WASSCE and subsequently attended the University of Nigeria, Nsukka (UNN) where, in 1975, he graduated top in his class with a Second Class Upper Honours in Zoology and a Ph.D. in Parasitology (1980), after a year's research training at the University of Leeds, United Kingdom. His academic achievements earned him the University of Nigeria's Foundation AID Scholarship (1972–1975) and he became the first person ever to receive the Vice-Chancellor's prize for the Best overall graduating Postgraduate Student (1980), a feat which one of his sons would also receive 24 years later with a First Class in Engineering and becoming University of Nigeria's Best overall graduating Undergraduate Student while another son of his would achieve a similar feat with a Distinction in Engineering at the MSc level in RGU, Aberdeen. Prof. Celestine Onwuliri was married to Prof. (Mrs.) Viola Onwuliri and they had five children.

Career and accomplishments 
Onwuliri moved to University of Jos after his PhD and subsequently garnered over 32 years of teaching, research, administrative and community service experience across six universities culminating in his becoming the Acting Vice Chancellor of the University of Jos and then fifth substantive Vice Chancellor of the FUTO.

Professor Celestine Onwuliri was prominent in helminthic parasitological research including the ecology and epidemiology of parasitic helminthes which causes many severe communicable diseases such as Dracunculiasis (Guinea worm disease), Onchocerciasis (River blindness), Filariasis, schistomiasis and other intestinal helminthosis. In this research he taught 25 doctor of philosophy (PhD) candidates and more than 160 candidates at MSc. and Bsc. levels in Nigeria and overseas, many of whom became professors, administrators, politicians, and businesspeople. Professor C.O.E. Onwuliri published over 200 articles in peer reviewed journals, and presented several invited papers nationally and internationally. He consequently received and attracted many grants, international linkages and affiliations.

One of Professor Onwuliri's landmark contributions to science is his description of a dichotomous pathway of energy metabolism in the infective stages of parasitic nematodes which confirmed the presence of functional Krebs cycle enzymes in parasitic nematodes (published in Parasitology, 90:169-177[1985]). He was also an editor of many scientific journals including the Nigerian Journal of Parasitology, International Journal of Environment health and human development, Journal of General studies and Nigerian Journal of Natural sciences where he was chairman of the editorial advisory board.

At the University of Jos, he was part of the pioneer team that nurtured to fruition three Postgraduate programmes in the department of Zoology namely – Applied Entomology and Parasitology, Applied Hydrobiology and Fisheries, and Conservation Biology and Ornithological Studies where over 600 scientists have been produced. He held several positions including:
 Head of Department of Zoology
 Dean, Faculty of Natural Sciences, (he was dean three times and in last tenure his Faculty was ranked best Faculty of Science in all Nigerian Universities by the National Universities Commission (CVC News 2003, vol. 3, no. 8, p. 5.) beating the universities of Lagos, Port-harcourt and the Universities of Nigeria to the second, third and fourth positions respectively)
 Sub-Dean, School of Postgraduate Studies
 Deputy Vice-Chancellor (Academic)
 Acting Vice-Chancellor

He also worked outside UNIJOS as the following:
 the Director, Academic Planning, Imo State University Owerri;
 Visiting Professor, Nassarawa State University, Keffi;
 Visiting Professor, Federal University of Technology, Yola;

Prof. Onwuliri served as consultant to several national and international organizations chief among which are:

 Consultant to WHO-TDR National Survey of Onchocerciasis in Kano (1989–1990)
 Consultant to WHO-TDR on Multi-center Rapid assessment study on onchocerciasis in plateau state (1990–1992)
 Consultant on River blindness foundation (RBF)
 Consultant to the Nigerian Guinea Worm Eradication Programme (1988–2008)
 Consultant to the Japanese International Cooperation Agency (JICA) (1984–1994)
 external consultant to the Carter Center/Global 2000 on Lymphatic Filariasis Elimination (1997–2006).

He was appointed by WHO as Advisor on its Community Directed Treatment with Ivermectin (CDTI) project in WHO/African Programme on Onchocerciasis Control (APOC) assisted countries (2003)

He became Vice-Chancellor, Federal University of Technology Owerri between 2006–2011. Concomitantly, he served as Alternate Chairman of the Committee of Vice-Chancellors (CVC) of Nigerian Universities (June 2010 – February 2011) and briefly as Chairman of CVC (February 2011 – June 2011).

Honorable Commissioner and service to larger society 
Prof. C.O.E. Onwuliri served twice as Honorable Commissioner in Imo State first as the Honorable Commissioner for Information, Culture, Youths during which he hosted the 11th National Sports Festival, tagged, “IMO 98” dubbed one of the most successful National Sports events (1998–99) in the country; and also served as the Honorable Commissioner of Agriculture and Natural Resources.  In his earlier years in Jos, he founded and served as President of the University of Nigeria Alumni Association (UNAA), Jos Branch and Founded, Rotary Club, Naraguta, Jos and became their First Rotarian President.

Prof. Onwuliri was known for his humility, love and respect of all people irrespective of their social stratification and had an uncanny ability to engage and connect with anyone.

He had held the following positions:
 National President Nigerian Society of Parasitology (now Parasitology and Public Health Society of Nigeria) 1993–1997;
 Honorable commissioner for Information, Culture, Youth and Sports, Imo state 1997–99;
 Honorable commissioner for Agriculture and Natural Resources 1998;
 Member Board of Governors University of Jos Demonstration Secondary school 1983–97;
 Member University Press (1993–2001); Chairman Board of Directors University of Jos Bookstore;
 Chairman board of director NYSC Imo state 1997–99;
 Chairman Imo Broadcasting Cooperation 1997–1999;
 Chairman Imo Sports Council 1997–99;
 Member of Council University of Jos 1996–2006;
 Member Committee of Assessors Nigeria National Merit Award 2002-08;
 Member Federal Government official delegation 2005 Christian pilgrimage to the holy land (appointed by President Olusegun Obasanjo.

Federal University of Technology, Owerri 
As Vice Chancellor of the Federal University of Technology, Owerri, Prof. Onwuliri, set in motion a 10 -goal strategic plan aimed at enhancing the integrity of the institution to produce world-class academicians and professionals and also updated the institution with approximately fifty infrastructure projects including faculty buildings, department buildings, the tarring of roads and the provision of staff quarters for lecturers, all before he concluded his tenure, with six of those buildings being commissioned in one day and completed previous abandoned infrastructure projects in FUTO.
As VC, he served as Member, Presidential Technical Committee on the Consolidation of Tertiary institutions in Nigeria 2006–2007, Member, Ministerial Committee on the harmonization of ICT in Tertiary Institutions, Member British Council Prime Ministers Initiative strategic dialogue.

At the time of his death, Professor C.O.E. Onwuliri was a visiting professor at the National Universities Commission, Abuja where he was Chairman Standing Committee on Private Universities (SCOPU).

Fellowships, honors and awards 
Prof. Onwuliri received fellowships, honors and awards including;

 Fellow, NAS
 Fellow, Nigerian Society for Parasitology
 Fellow, Biotechnology Society of Nigeria (FBSN)
 Fellow, Civilian Institute of Democratic Administration (FCIDA)
 Fellow, Nigerian Society of Biochemistry and Molecular Biology (FNSBMB)
 Fellow, the Association of Aquatic Sciences (FAAS)
 Honorary Fellow Nigerian Institute of Biomedical Engineering (HonFNIBE)
 Fellow, Society for Environmental Health (FSEH)
 Fellow African Scientific Institute (ASIF)
 Fellow Solar Energy Society of Nigeria (FSESN)
 Distinguished Academic Leadership Award (DALA) by COFICON
 An alumnus of High Achievement (ALOHA) of the University of Nigeria Alumni Association (UNAA), a coveted award given for outstanding achievements and contributions to the society
 Award of excellence by Nigerian institute of physics
 National Associations of Nigerian Students (NANS) Maiden Nigerian Heroes Award (only VC in the Nigerian university system to receive this award) 2009
 Best Vice Chancellor Award by Niger Delta Students Association 2009
 Most Dynamic Vice Chancellor in Southeastern Nigeria (2010)
 Most Outstanding vice-chancellor in Nigeria by SIFE- Nigeria Projects

For his contribution to the physical and manpower development of his community and communities across Igboland, he was honoured by traditional institutions who conferred on him chieftaincy titles including:
 Okanmuta Nwachinaemere of Amuzi autonomous community
 Ezi-nwanwa 1 of Amaimo, the UgoMmuta of OkpuhuNkpa autonomous community in Abia State
 Ezi-nwanwa 1 of Ikeduru Clan
 UgoNmuta of Mbaise, Nwachimereze of Amuzi inter alia

Prof. Celestine Onwuliri, a Rosa Mystica & St. Jude Thaddeus devotee was conferred with many awards in the Catholic Church including:
 the Pontifical Honours by Pope Benedict XVI
 Ezinna Chimereze by the St. Jude Catholic Parish Amuzi
 the St. Joseph The Worker Distinguished Merit Award by the Imo State University Owerri
 Ambassador of Mary by the Ahiara Diocesan CWO
 Ambassador General of St. Jude
 Provincial Patron, Owerri Archdiocese Laity Council
 Youth Ambassador Award; Catholic Ambassador Award
 Patron CWO Umuahia Diocese
 Grand Patron FUTO Chaplaincy

For his contributions to Science research and education at home and abroad, he received the highest science-based honour in Nigeria – the Fellowship of the Nigerian Academy of Science (FNAS).

Knights of St. John International 
Prof Celestine Onwuliri was the Supreme Subordinate President of the Knights with rank Major General.  As the head of the Knights, his 4-point Agenda for Knights, a Blueprint for Peace and Progress in Nigeria formed a backbone and framework for peace and was highlighted by the 4th Memorial Lecture Guest speaker, Brig. Gen. Dr. George Ikioumoton in a speech entitled “Professor Celestine Onwuliri's 4-point Agenda for Knights, a Blueprint for Peace and Progress in Nigeria". He provided leadership and had earlier served as the Knights of St John International Worthy President in Jos and later First Vice President, Supreme Subordinate Commandery Nigeria (2003–2009) before eventually becoming the National Supreme Subordinate President of the Knights.

Non-profit work 
A few months before his death, Prof. Celestine Onwuliri registered PROFOUND, a non-profit, non-governmental organisation (NGO) established with the sole purpose of providing succour to the underprivileged in society by enhancing their access to education, healthcare and shelter as well as providing empowerment to individuals and communities in order to fulfil their development potential.

After his death 
As a mark of honour, his colleagues at the Imo State University, Owerri on Wednesday, June 20, 2012 wore their full academic regalia, held a valedictory session to bid him farewell and the Vice Chancellor of the University, Prof. Bethram Nwoke (who was Prof. Onwuliri's Phd student), led the session, where his colleagues showered encomiums on him describing him as a great scholar, scientist and an astute administrator par excellence.

On the same day, the Imo State government organised an interdenominational service for Onwuliri and some others from the state who died in the plane crash. Markets in the Owerri metropolis remained closed during the period, while all the state senior civil servants wore black and converged at the Ahiajoku Convention Centre, Owerri, where the state governor, Chief Rochas Okorocha, led the state executive council members for candle light procession, while the speaker, Hon. Benjamin Uwajiogu and others followed in order of sequence with the first Bible reading drawn from the book of Thessalonians 3:18 and was read by the Deputy Governor, Sir Jude Agbaso.

In Onwuliri's honour, the leadership of the Federal University of Technology Owerri (FUTO) Students Union Government (SUG) organised a candle light procession on campus.

His burial was attended by the masses, students of Federal University of Technology Owerri, Knights of St. John and also dignitaries like President Goodluck Jonathan represented by the Secretary to the Government of the Federation (SGF) Anyim Pius Anyim, Ministers, Governors including Ikedi Ohakim, Peter Obi,  Senators including Hope Uzodinma, Dr. Kema Chikwe, and many Honorable members of the Federal House of Representatives including Hon. Emeka Ihedioha and many other distinguished personalities from the Academia and various fields.

The Catholic Archbishop  of Jos, Most Reverend Ignatius Kaigama at Onwuliri's burial described him as a personal friend, a committed Catholic who put so much time and energy to the service of the Lord especially the Catholic Archdiocese of Jos urged the wife and children of the late Onwuliri to ensure upholding the legacies of their great father and husband, while describing him as a patriotic Nigerian

The Vice Chancellor of the University of Jos, Prof. Hayward Babale Mafuyai stated that late Prof. Celestine Onwuliri was a great personality who left his mark on the sands of time, Speaking at his one-year remembrance Mass at the Good Shepherd Catholic Chaplaincy of the University of Jos, Permanent site, the Vice Chancellor described him as a “man of excellence, full of compassion, kindness and mercy, and very brilliant in all the things he did”.

President Goodluck Jonathan urged university students to emulate the virtues that characterised the life of the former Vice-Chancellor of Federal University of Technology Owerri Prof Celestine Onwuliri; he described Onwuliri as an accomplished academic and lauded his Rich academic history while speaking during the inauguration of an ultra-modern laboratory built by the management of Gregory University Uturu in Onwuliri's honour.

Posthumous honours 
Prof. Onwuliri received several posthumous honours including:

 the Graduate Theological Foundation (GTF), USA, Celestine O. E. Onwuliri Fellowship in Scientific Research and Human Values. The GTF is an Educational Institution of higher learning located in Mishawaka, Indiana, USA.
 the 500-capacity ultra-modern library built and dedicated to Prof. C.O.E. Onwuliri in Niger Mixed Secondary, School, Asaba
 the proposed foundation laying ceremony of Prof. Onwuliri Library and computer centre Amuzi;
 commissioning of Prof. Celestine Onwuliri Ultra Modern Biology Laboratory at the Gregory University Uturu, Abia State;
 the Prof. C. O. E. Onwuliri Classroom Block in an Umuahia Seminary
 the Parasitology and Public Health Society of Nigeria (PPSN) book titled “My Society and Prof. C.O.E. Onwuliri" where members recounted their various experiences with Prof. Onwuliri in appreciation of how he touched their lives;
 the inauguration of the “Prof. Celestine O.E. Onwuliri Young Scientist Award" by the Nigerian Parasitology Society, to honour him and achieve his desire of encouraging young scientists;
 the naming of the International Conference building in FUTO after him as the Celestine Onwuliri International Conference Center Federal University of Technology, Owerri;
 the institution of the Prof. C.O.E. Onwuliri Memorial Scholarship Award. by the International Liaison of Mbaise Indigenes ILMI
 the inauguration of the annual Prof. Celestine O. E. Onwuliri Memorial Lecture.

Onwuliri Memorial Lecture 
The Prof. Celestine O. E. Onwuliri Memorial lecture has taken place five times so far starting from the 1 year anniversary of his death till date with the 1st one being held at Federal University of Technology Owerri in 2013 and the lecture was titled  “Intellectualism in Nigeria's Transformation” was delivered by the Nigerian Minister for Power, Prof. Chinedu Nebo and during which the Governing Council and Senate of the Federal University of Technology, Owerri resolved to rename the FUTO international conference hall after the late Professor Celestine Onwuliri as the “CELESTINE ONWULIRI INTERNATIONAL CONFERENCE CENTRE”; the 2nd Onwuliri Memorial lecture held in 2014 and the guest speaker, Nigeria's Minister of Defence, State, Senator Musiliu Obanikoro, who delivered a lecture titled ‘Security and National Development’ discussing efforts to tackle Boko Haram and other challenges. In 2015, the third Prof. Celestine Onwuliri Memorial lecture held at the Full Moon, Owerri organized by the Professor C.O.E. Onwuliri foundation and the guest speaker, Professor Julius Okojie, Executive Secretary of the National Universities Commission spoke on the Challenges of Nigerian Universities in the 21st Century. The 4th Prof. Onwuliri Memorial Lecture in 2016 was hosted by the Governor of Enugu State, Gov. Ifeanyi Ugwuanyi with Bishop Matthew Hassan Kukah and Brig. Gen. Dr. George Ikioumoton  as speaker and the lecture was titled  “Professor Celestine Onwuliri’s 4-point Agenda for Knights, a Blueprint for Peace and Progress in Nigeria". Also six Imo Undergraduates being presented with the ILMI-instituted COE Onwuliri Memorial Scholarship Award.

On June 16, 2017, President Goodluck Jonathan, Governor Peter Obi and Dr. Paschal Dozie, the chairman of MTN Nigeria, all participated in the 5th Prof. Celestine Onwuliri Memorial lecture, and the lecture titled: “The problem with Nigeria” was delivered by former Governor Peter Obi while the Obi of Onitsha, Igwe Nnaemeka Achebe was one of the Royal Fathers of the Day and it was followed by the 2017 edition of the Professor COE Onwuliri Annual Memorial Scholarship Award, instituted by the International Liaison of Mbaise Indigenes ILMI in Diaspora and the scholarship award was presented to 6 Imo Undergraduate students. The Onwuliri memorial lecture has continued to attract reputable Nigerians, Ministers, Governors, Senators, and many others and has been used to encourage them to support the causes of the PROFOUND foundation to help the poor and indigent

In the words of one of his students describing Prof. Onwuliri, he said "You were a father indeed, You showed love, out of your mouth came words of wisdom. You were humble, never looked down on anyone irrespective of age and social stratification".

See also
List of vice chancellors in Nigeria
Vice Chancellors of Nigerian Universities
Scholars of Nigeria
University of Jos

References 

1952 births
People from Mbaise
University of Nigeria alumni
2012 deaths
Vice-Chancellors of Federal University of Technology Owerri